USS Combat (AMc-69) was an Accentor-class coastal minesweeper acquired by the U.S. Navy for the dangerous task of removing mines from minefields laid in the water to prevent ships from passing.

Combat, formerly named Comrade, was launched 6 October 1941 by Hogdon Bros., Goudy, and Stevens, East Boothbay, Maine; sponsored by Miss C. Goudy; and placed in service 24 February 1942.

World War II service 

She served in the 1st Naval District in New England waters during the war.

Post-war deactivation 

Combat was transferred to the Maritime Commission for disposal 5 August 1946.

References

External links 
 

 

Accentor-class minesweepers
World War II mine warfare vessels of the United States
Ships built in Boothbay, Maine
1941 ships